Bathytoma arbucklei is a species of sea snail, a marine gastropod mollusk in the family Borsoniidae.

Distribution
This species occurs in the Indian Ocean off Transkei, Southeast South Africa, at depths between 300 m and 500 m.

Description
The length of this biconical, white shell varies between 14.5 mm and 17.2 mm; its width between 6.6 mm and 8 mm. The periphery shows thin spiral threads, crossed by irregular threads resulting in fine granules at the intersections. The four whorls of the teleoconch show a strong, rounded shoulder. The base of spire whorls have strong spiral lirae, increasing in number towards the body whorl. The columella lacks a pleat.

References

 Kilburn R.N. (1986). Turridae (Mollusca: Gastropoda) of southern Africa and Mozambique. Part 3. Subfamily Borsoniinae. Annals of the Natal Museum. 27: 633-720 page(s): 639, figs 28-29, 33-34

Endemic fauna of South Africa
arbucklei
Gastropods described in 1986